Jungjin Lee (born 1961) is a Korean photographer and artist who currently lives and works in New York City.

Background

Jungjin Lee was born in Korea in 1961. She studied calligraphy in childhood and majored in ceramics at Hongik University, graduating with a Bachelor's of Fine Art in 1984.  After graduating Lee worked as a photo journalist and later as a freelance photographer.

In 1987, she immersed herself for one year in a project focused on documenting the life of an old man who made his living hunting for wild ginseng. This experience motivated Lee to become a photographer and expand her technical knowledge of photography by traveling to New York City and enrolling in New York University to pursue an MA in photography.

While in New York City, Lee worked for the photographer Robert Frank. Later, she took a road trip across the United States. In her travels she encountered the American Desert, a landscape that she is deeply moved by and which becomes the subject of several of her photographic series, including  Desert (1990–94), American Desert I–IV (1990–1996), On Road (2000–01), Wind (2004–07) and Remains (2012–). Lee photographs these barren landscapes when they are transformed by the tumultuous weather, discarded refuse, decaying structures and by her own photographic process.

Lee's Unnamed Road (2010-12) was part of This Place.

Photographic process
Lee uses a unique photographic process:

For my work, the darkroom process is just as important as the digital process. Throughout the process, I focus on transmitting on my prints the feelings that I felt as the time of taking the photograph. I try to deliver the essence of what I truly want to express.

She begins by photographing the subject with a medium-format panoramic camera. She prints on a traditional mulberry paper which she hand sensitizes with a brush using Liquid Light. This print is then scanned and Lee further manipulates the image in Photoshop. The resulting image is a high contrast black and white print, in which the indexical brush marks are still visible. Lee effaces the technological capability of her digital camera to communicate her emotional state of mind at the time she takes the photograph to the viewer. This process also results in an image that recalls traditional Asian ink painting.

Recognition
Lee's photographic practice is important within the context of contemporary Korean photography, but also more broadly she is part of a contemporary photographic movement of photographers pushing the physical boundaries of photography as a medium to expose and communicate the essence of a subject. For Lee, effacing the technological capabilities of her camera allows her to explore the symbolic boundaries of landscape as a genre.

Photo scholar and critic Eugenia Parry explores Lee's series through the lens of Buddhist spirituality in the essay that accompanies Lee's photobook Wind. Parry observes that in Lee's photographs she contrasts discarded props of human life with the land, symbolically acting as her on Buddhist teacher, asking viewers to "view ordinary things, love change, tolerate absolute incomprehensibility. Contemplate the temporal, recognize the celestial".

Photo critic and historian Vicki Goldberg observes that Lee's landscapes represent her own, "introspective states and thoughts." While the majority of Lee's work focuses on the land; in several series she explores other subjects in the series including Pagodas (1998); crumbling Buddhist sculptures, Buddhas (2002); every objects, Thing (2003–06) and portraits, Breath (2009–).

Publications

Solo exhibitions

 A Lonely Cabin In A Far Away Island, The Camera Club of New York, New York City, 1989
 Blue Sky Gallery, Portland, OR, USA, 1992
 Self Portrait, PaceMacGill Gallery, New York City, 1995
 Buddha, Museum of Photography, Seoul, Korea, 2002
 Blue Sky Gallery, Portland, OR, USA, 2003
 Road To The Wind, Goeun Museum Of Photography, Busan, Korea, 2008
 Wind By Jungjinlee, Aperture Gallery, New York City, 2011
 Thing, Andrea Robbi Museum, St.Moritz, Switzerland, 2013
 Unnamed Road, Camera Obscura Gallery, Paris, 2015; Stephan Witschi Gallery, Zurich, Switzerland, 2015
 Works From Everglades And Unnamed Road, Howard Greenberg Gallery, New York City, 2015
 Everglades, Stephan Witschi Gallery, Zurich, Switzerland, 2016
A retrospective.
 Andrew Bae Gallery, Everglades/Opening, Chicago, USA, 2017

Collections
Lee's work is held in the following public collections:
Metropolitan Museum of Art: 9 prints (as of 27 December 2021)
Whitney Museum of American Art: 1 print (as of 27 December 2021)
Museum of Photography, Seoul

References

External links

Echo, Städtische Gallery
Echo, Fotomuseum Winterthur, YouTube
This Place: Jungjin Lee, Unnamed Road
This Place: An Interview with Jungjin Lee, Paper Journal
This Place: Jungjin Lee, Unnamed Road, YouTube

1961 births
Living people
South Korean photographers
South Korean women photographers